The men's Greco-Roman 120 kg is a competition featured at the 2013 European Wrestling Championships, and was held at the Tbilisi Sports Palace in Tbilisi, Georgia on 23 March 2013.

Medalists

Results
Legend
F — Won by fall

Final

Top Half

Bottom Half

Repechage

References

2013 European Wrestling Championships